Arran Blackburn Stephens  (born 1944) is a Canadian entrepreneur, author, and philanthropist.  He is co-founder of Nature's Path, a leading manufacturer of organic foods.  He is regarded as a pioneer in the food industry and has received numerous acknowledgments for his work promoting sustainable agriculture, organics, and opposition to genetic food modification.

Early life 
Arran Stephens was born on Vancouver Island in British Columbia, the son of Rupert Stephens, a berry farmer and songwriter, and Gwen Stephens.  Stephens has a brother, Godfrey Stephens, a well-known Canadian artist.  Stephens is of English and Scottish ancestry.  His paternal great-grandfather was Lt. General JM Cripps, of the Bengal Staff Corps, India.

Stephens grew up on a berry farm on Vancouver Island until his early teens, when his parents relocated to Los Angeles, following his father's pursuit of a songwriting career.  For a brief time, Stephens attended Hollywood High School.  In his later teen years, Stephens supported himself as a painter and poet with gallery showings in Los Angeles, San Francisco, New York City, and Vancouver.

In 1964 while living in New York, Stephens became interested in spirituality and mysticism.  In 1967 he traveled to India to study at an ashram for seven months under the guidance of well known spiritual teacher Sant Kirpal Singh. In August 1967, Stephens returned to Vancouver and opened The Golden Lotus, Canada's first vegetarian restaurant in the heart of Kitsilano.

In 1968, Stephens went back to India to study further with Sant Kirpal Singh for six months. On March 4, 1969, he had an arranged marriage to Ratana Mala Bagga, and returned with his bride to Canada.

Beginning of Nature's Path 
In 1971, Arran (and Ratana) opened LifeStream Natural Foods, a retailer, manufacturer and distributor of organic foods that was eventually sold to Kraft Foods in 1981.  Around that time, Arran and Ratana would go on to open "Woodlands," a successful vegetarian restaurant in Vancouver.  In 1985, the Stephens' founded Nature's Path, and by 1990 would open North America's first certified organic breakfast cereal production facility in Delta, British Columbia.

Originally focusing on cereals and breads, the company now sells a variety of products including toaster pastries, waffles, and granola.  Nature's Path has grown to distribute its products to over 40 countries worldwide, with several hundred employees and production facilities in Canada and the United States.  The company's product line has remained 100% certified organic since its founding and the company remains family-run and privately owned.  In 2012, Nature's Path acquired Que Pasa Mexican Foods, a producer of organic tortillas, chips, and salsas.  Two of the Stephens' four children, Arjan and Jyoti, are active in leadership within the company.

Leadership 
Stephens served on the Organic Trade Association (OTA) board during the creation and launch of the USDA National Organic Program.  He was an early supporter and founding board member of the Non-GMO Project.  Stephens was also a vocal supporter of California's Proposition 37 initiative. Stephens has also served on the boards of The Rodale Institute, and as the Chairman of the Richmond Food Security Society. He has served on the federally incorporated charity, Science of Spirituality of Canada since 1974.

From 1971-1975, Arran served on the leadership board for Organic Merchants, the first organic trade association in North America, predecessor to OFPANA and the Organic Trade Association. Furthermore, Arran Stephens also served on leadership boards for the Canadian Health Food Association, Richmond Food Security Society, UBC Land & Food Systems  and Kwantlen Polytechnic Food Advisory Board. He received no compensation for his service on these various non-profit boards.

Awards  
In 1997, Stephens received the Canadian Health Food Association Lifetime Achievement Award.

In 2002, Stephens received the Ernst & Young Manufacturing & Distribution Award.

In 2002, Stephens was honored with the Organics Achievement Award by the CHFA.

In 2011, Arran and Ratana Stephens made a $1,000,000 contribution to the Vancouver General Hospital Gastroenterology Department.

In 2012, The Rodale Institute announced the establishment of the Ratana and Arran Stephens Scholarship Fund, awarding scholarships to war veterans who are students of organic agriculture, made possible through a donation from Nature's Path.

In 2013, Stephens the New York-based Leadership Institute honored Arran Stephens as the recipient of the first-ever Leadership Award for Character, Vision, and Impact at The Leadership Institute's launch event. He was also awarded the New Hope Hall of Legends Award, which celebrates individuals who have made significant contributions to the development and evolution of the natural products industry.

In 2013, Arran and Ratana Stephens won the Growing the Organic Industry Award from the Organic Trade Association.

In 2013, Arran Stephens was awarded the OTA Organic Leadership Award.

In April 2014, Ratana and Arran won the Stewardship Award for their leadership in the food industry from the Food in Canada magazine.

In November 2017, Ratana and Arran Stephens won the Leader in Sustainability award given by the Rabobank North America Leadership Awards.

In September 2018, Arran was awarded the Organic Pioneer Award from the Rodale Institute.

The University of Victoria (UVIC) announced that Ratana and Arran are to receive an honorary doctorate degree in Education in June 2020, however, this has been delayed due to COVID-19.

In 2021, Arran and Ratana received the Order of British Columbia. They were among a select few individuals to receive this honor, and they are recognized as extraordinary individuals who made significant contributions to B.C.

The Stephens received the Canada Marketing Legends Award in 2021 from the American Marketing Association.

Ratana and Arran won the Sustainable Food Award from Ecovia Intelligence in 2021 for their contributions to building a sustainable food industry. The 2021 awards were hosted online due to the pandemic.

In 2021, Arran and Ratana received the Lifetime Achievement Award in the 7th Annual Drishti Awards for their outstanding efforts to contribute to a civil society.

Philanthropy 
Arran and Ratana Stephens, and their family company have been involved in many philanthropic efforts over the years, primarily to the following:

 Food Banks across North America (over $27,000,000 in food and cash) serving those in need
 Gardens for Good (establishing organic food gardens in underprivileged neighborhoods, community centers and schools)
 Vancouver General Hospital (gastroenterology department) 
 Vancouver Children’s Hospital
 St. Paul’s Hospital Wellness Garden
 University of British Columbia (UBC Farm / Land & Food Systems)
 University of Victoria (bursaries for students)
 Kwantlen Polytechnic
 Simon Fraser University
 Science of Spirituality Meditation Centre

Publications 
Stephens has authored two books: Journey to the Luminous (Elton-Wolf, 1999), Moth & the Flame  and co-authored with Eliot Jay Rosen, The Compassionate Diet—How What You Eat Can Change Your Life and Save the Planet (Rodale Books, 2011)

References

External links 
 
 Arran Stephens' portfolio of artwork

1944 births
Living people
Businesspeople from Vancouver
Canadian chief executives
Canadian philanthropists
Canadian non-fiction writers
Members of the Order of British Columbia
Writers from Vancouver